Dennis Agyare "Denny" Antwi (born 12 January 1993) is a Ghanaian professional footballer who plays as a forward.

Club career
Antwi started his career with Accra Academy in 2009.

Kelantan FA
Antwi signed with Malaysian Super League giant Kelantan FA for two years contract for 2012 Malaysia Super League seasons. He makes great appearances with Kelantan in the Super League.
He also was the 5th Ghanaian footballer ever to play for Kelantan FA after Edward Aboagye, Enock Bentil, Ishaq Debrah and Emmanuel Okine. The team had their first major success in the 2012 season, when they have won treble which is Malaysia Super League championship, Malaysia FA Cup and Malaysia Cup. Domestically, TRW have won the Malaysia Super League Championship on 2 occasions, most recently in the 2012 season, 2 Malaysia Cup titles, 2 Malaysia FA Cup titles, 1 Charity Shield and 1 Malaysia Premier League title.2012 was their debut playing in the AFC Cup. They played well in the group stage to gain first place. However, the team lost in the quarter final to Erbil SC.

Loan to Perlis FA
After a season played for Kelantan, Antwi was loan to Malaysian Premier League based club, Perlis FA caused of his young age. However, he was terminated his contract with Kelantan and back to Ghana.

Inter Allies F.C.
Antwi joins newly promoted club, International Allies F.C. which competing in the Ghana Premier League.

FC Rosengård 1917
He signed in January 2014 with Swedish Division 2 Östra Götaland side FC Rosengård 1917.

FK Jerv
In August 2015, Antwi signed a 1.5 year contract with Norwegian OBOS-ligaen side FK Jerv. In his first season, he played 11 times and scored four goals in OBOS-ligaen. He also scored one goal and played in all four play-off matches for promotion to top flight Tippeligaen, just to see his team lose the final match of the play-off against local rivals IK Start 3-1 after a 1–1 draw at home.

After netting five goals in 15 league appearances for Jerv in the 2016 season, Antwi signed for IK Start at the end of July 2016 in a controversial transfer. Initially he signed a pre-contract, which would bring him to Start on a free transfer on 1 December 2016. Then the player himself publicly announced that he wanted to move to neighbouring club Start immediately, and the clubs agreed upon a compensation fee expected to be around 500 000 Norwegian kroner (around €55 000 at the time).

Antwi played a total of 32 official games and scored 10 goals for Jerv.

IK Start
After signing with Start at the end of July 2016, Antwi made his Tippeligaen debut against Sarpsborg 08 as a 67th-minute substitute. Start went on to lose Antwi's debut game 1–0, which meant they extended the number of games without winning in Tippeligaen to 33, in the number 33's 33rd game in Norwegian football. Antwi scored only one goal, a tap-in in an away fixture against Lillestrøm SK, in 11 appearances in his debut sesong in Tippeligaen. His debut goal will be remembered for Antwi being attacked by a Lillestrøm fan after celebrating in front of the home supporters, Kanarifansen.

Antwi was loaned out to Åsane Fotball in February 2018, and returned to Start at the end of 2018.

Trelleborgs FF
After being released from IK Start, Antwi signed for Superettan club Trelleborgs FF on 23 March 2019. He left the club at te end of the years.

Career statistics

Honours

Club
Gokulam Kerala F.C.

 I-League
 Champions (1): 2020–21

Personal
I-League Team of the season:2020–21

International career
Antwi once attended a national training camp with the Ghana national under-23 football team for the 2011 CAF U-23 Championship qualification. However, he was never chosen for the final squad.

References

External links
 
 

Alumni of the Accra Academy
1993 births
Living people
Ghanaian footballers
Ghanaian expatriate footballers
Ghana international footballers
Footballers from Accra
Perlis FA players
Kelantan FA players
FK Jerv players
IK Start players
Åsane Fotball players
FC Rosengård 1917 players
Trelleborgs FF players
Al-Taawon (UAE) Club players
Superettan players
Norwegian First Division players
Eliteserien players
Malaysia Premier League players
UAE First Division League players
Association football forwards
Ghanaian expatriate sportspeople in Sweden
Expatriate footballers in Sweden
Ghanaian expatriate sportspeople in Malaysia
Expatriate footballers in Malaysia
Ghanaian expatriate sportspeople in Norway
Expatriate footballers in Norway
Ghanaian expatriate sportspeople in the United Arab Emirates
Expatriate footballers in the United Arab Emirates